KFGG-LP 101.9 FM is a radio station licensed to Marble Falls, Texas. The station broadcasts a Christian Talk and Teaching format and is owned by Rockpile Church.

References

External links
KFGG-LP's official website
 

FGG-LP
FGG-LP
Radio stations established in 2004
2004 establishments in Texas